Luis María Urquizu Markuerkiaga (born 25 August 1936) is a Spanish former footballer who played as a forward.

Career
Born in Ondarroa, Urquizu played as a defender for Alavés.

Personal life
His father Juan was also a footballer.

References

1936 births
Living people
Spanish footballers
Deportivo Alavés players
Segunda División players
Association football forwards
People from Ondarroa
Sportspeople from Biscay
Footballers from the Basque Country (autonomous community)